Tortyra slossonia, commonly known as the reflective tortyra moth,  ficus budworm or Slosson's metalmark moth, is a moth of the family Choreutidae. It is known from Florida.

The wingspan is about 13 mm.

Etymology
It is named for entomologist Annie Trumbull Slosson.

References

Tortyra
Moths described in 1900